Lizard Acres was a former cattle ranch, subdivision, and train stop situated in Maricopa County, Arizona, near the present day town of Surprise.

Lizard Acres (noted as Lizard on topographic maps) was a train stop just north of Surprise, Arizona. The stop is near current day Grand Avenue and Bell Road in Surprise, Arizona. The site also held a cattle farm.

The 1,800 acre cattle ranch was owned by J. Charles Wetzler. In the early 1960s, the ranch held 13,000 cattle.

Sun City West, Arizona, a retirement community, was built on part of the ranch in 1960 and 1972.

References

Populated places in Maricopa County, Arizona